The Coal City Review is an annual literary journal of prose, poetry, reviews and illustrations published by the University of Kansas English MFA Program and edited by Brian Daldorph since 1989. The Review typically features the work of many writers, but periodically spotlights one author, as in the case of 2006 Nelson Poetry Book Award-winner voyeur poems by Matthew Porubsky.

Selected contributions
 Jackie Bartley, "Trip to Spain" (poem), Vol. 19 (July 2003) 
 Jack Granath, "Lines Written While Fixing a Bicycle" (poem), Vol. 15 (October 2000) 
 Jack Granath, "Obligatory Millennial Time Capsule Poem" (poem), Vol. 15, (October 2000) 
 Jack Granath, "Dear Aunt May" (poem), Vol. 19 (July 2003) 
 Jack Granath, "The Poem Not Written" (poem), Vol. 19 (July 2003) 
 Jack Granath, "On Becoming a Poet" (poem), Vol. 21 (2006) 
 Jarret Keene, "Monster Fashion" Review, Vol. 19 (July 2003) 
 Gary Lechliter, "The Poltergeist Factory" Vol. 19 (July 2003) 
 Alana Merrit Mahaffey, "Still Life; The Abandoned Shotgun Shack Across Our Field" (poem), Vol. 19 (July 2003) 
 Catherine McCraw, "Frozen Solid" (poem), Vol. 19 
 Bryan Penberthy, "Thanks" (poem), Vol. 20, pg. 75 (January 2005) 
 Bryan Penberthy, "Through Ice" (poem), Vol. 20, pg. 76 (January 2005) 
 Corrina Wycoff, "The Shell Game" (short story), Vol. 21 (2006)
 Byron Case, "Migration" (poem), Vol. 36 (2015)

Additional contributors
 Marie C. Jones 
 Joel Long 
 Carrie Oeding
 James R. Whitley

Selected publications
 Porubsky, Matthew. Voyeur Poetry. (2006)
 Musgrave, John. Notes to the Man Who Shot Me: Vietnam War Poems. (2004) 122 pg. ISBN B0006SB6CM
 Musgrave, John. On snipers, laughter and death: Vietnam poems. (2001) 36 pg. ISBN B0006OYS8U
 Lechliter, Gary. Under the Fool Moon. (2001)

References

External links
 University of Kansas magazines

1989 establishments in Kansas
Poetry magazines published in the United States
Annual magazines published in the United States
Magazines established in 1998
University of Kansas
Magazines published in Kansas